Steve Pruski (c. 1924 – August 15, 1997) was a Canadian football player who played for the Toronto Argonauts. He won the Grey Cup with them in 1945, 1946 and 1947.

References

1920s births
1997 deaths
Canadian football ends
Toronto Argonauts players
Players of Canadian football from Ontario
Sportspeople from St. Catharines